Berwick may refer to:

Places

Antarctica
Berwick Glacier

Australia
Berwick, Victoria
City of Berwick, Victoria (defunct)

Canada
Berwick, New Brunswick
Berwick, Nova Scotia
Berwick, Ontario

New Zealand
Berwick, New Zealand

United Kingdom

England
Berwick-upon-Tweed, Northumberland
Berwick, East Sussex
Berwick railway station (East Sussex)
Berwick, Gloucestershire
Berwick Street Market, London
Berwick Tunnel, Shropshire
Berwick St John, Wiltshire

Scotland
North Berwick, East Lothian, Scotland
North Berwick Law, a hill situated to the south of the town
County of Berwick, a historic county in south-east Scotland
Berwick (Parliament of Scotland constituency)

United States
Berwick, Illinois
Berwick Township, Warren County, Illinois
Berwick, Iowa
Berwick, Kansas
Berwick, Louisiana
Berwick Bay, Louisiana
Berwick, Maine
Berwick (CDP), Maine, a census-designated place within the town
Berwick, Missouri
Berwick Township, Newton County, Missouri
Berwick, Ohio
Berwick Hotel, Cambridge, Ohio 
Berwick (Columbus, Ohio)
Berwick, North Dakota
Berwick, Pennsylvania
Berwick Area School District, Pennsylvania
Berwick Township, Adams County, Pennsylvania

People
Berwick (surname)
Berwick (cricketer), English cricketer

Facilities, structures
Berwick Academy (disambiguation)
Berwick Castle, in Berwick-upon-Tweed
Berwick High School (disambiguation)
Berwick power station (disambiguation), several station
Berwick railway station (disambiguation), several stations
Berwick College, a secondary college in Berwick, Victoria, Australia
Berwick station (disambiguation)

Groups, organizations, companies
Berwick RFC, a rugby union team in Berwick-upon-Tweed
Berwick Rangers F.C., a football team in Berwick-upon-Tweed

Other uses
Berwick (automobile), an electric car produced in 1904
Berwick cockle, a confection from Berwick upon Tweed
Berwick Prize, in mathematics, named for William Edward Hodgson Berwick
HMS Berwick, several Royal Navy ships
Treaty of Berwick (disambiguation), several treaties

See also